Nossa Senhora da Glória is a municipality located in the Brazilian state of Sergipe. It has a population density of 48 inhabitants per square kilometer.

References

Municipalities in Sergipe